The Lightning Bolt Tour was a concert tour by the American rock band Pearl Jam to support its tenth studio album, Lightning Bolt (2013). The tour started with two legs in North America, the first on the East Coast in October 2013, followed by a second leg on the West Coast the following month before finishing in their hometown of Seattle in December. Rolling Stone listed the tour as one of the 19 hottest tours to see in the fall of 2013.

Prior to these shows, the band played two shows in July, one in London, Ontario and the other at Wrigley Field, Chicago. The Chicago show became the fastest concert to sell-out at Wrigley Field. On July 3, 2013, guitarist Stone Gossard said that the Wrigley Field show would be "a special experience". The Wrigley show was interrupted for more than two hours due to the threat of lightning. The band returned onstage around midnight to continue their set, which included two new songs from their tenth studio album Lightning Bolt, before finishing at 2am.

On July 31, 2013, the press announced that the band would play the Big Day Out festival in New Zealand and Australia in January 2014. Following these shows, frontman Eddie Vedder played solo dates in Australia in February.

On December 13, 2013, the band announced an eleven-date European leg starting on June 16 at the Ziggo Dome in Amsterdam and finishing on July 11 at the Milton Keynes Bowl, England. On the next day a second date was added at the Ziggo Dome. On April 22, 2014, Pearl Jam's website announced that the band would play one night of each weekend of the Austin City Limits Music Festival in October. One month later, the band added another ten shows in the American Midwest, also scheduled for October.

After the shows in the Midwest, the band played at the annual Bridge School Benefit in Mountain View, California. The twenty 2014 shows grossed US$18.7 million and were attended by more than 264,000 people.

History
The first American leg started in Pittsburgh at the Consol Energy Center on October 11, 2013, the band's first show in the city since 2006. The Pittsburgh Post-Gazette said that the show was "an amazing, exhausting, uplifting opening night". They later listed the show as the best concert of 2013 in their review of the year. Writing for PopMatters, Sachyn Mital at the first of two Brooklyn shows said "Pearl Jam performed with vibrant, youthful energy working through a lot of heavy hitters". Across the two shows in Brooklyn, the band played 66 songs, repeating only 10 of these. On October 27, the band played in Baltimore for the first time in their career, and dedicated their song "Man of the Hour" to Lou Reed who had died earlier that day, before covering The Velvet Underground's "I'm Waiting for the Man". On November 1, the band headlined the Voodoo Music + Arts Experience in New Orleans. Former football player, Steve Gleason, introduced the band and created the setlist.

On November 15, 2013, as the second leg started, drummer Matt Cameron announced that he would not be touring with Soundgarden in 2014, due to prior commitments promoting Lightning Bolt. Later that day, the band played in Dallas. The Dallas Morning News said that "at two-and-half-hours, the concert dragged at times. But it was seldom predictable, with obscure songs intertwined with the singalong hits "Better Man" and "Alive"." Sleater-Kinney reformed for a single song during the show in Portland on November 29: they joined Pearl Jam onstage for the band's final song, a cover of Neil Young's "Rockin' in the Free World."  The West Coast leg finished in the band's hometown of Seattle, with a set that included a cover of MC5's "Kick Out the Jams", which featured Steve Turner and Mark Arm of Mudhoney and Kim Thayil of Soundgarden.

In January 2014, the band played on the Big Day Out festival around New Zealand and Australia. Lucy Slight of MTV News said their Gold Coast show was "nothing but pure rock from start to finish". After the show in Melbourne, Paul Cashmere writing for Noise11 said that "The Stones may be the greatest rock and roll band in the world for their generation. Pearl Jam may well be the greatest rock and roll band in the world for the kids of the Stones generation." The band finished the Big Day Out shows in Perth and concluded their set with a cover of "Rockin' in the Free World", which featured Win Butler of Arcade Fire on vocals.

On June 16, 2014, the band started the European leg of the tour, playing at the Ziggo Dome in Amsterdam. In Milan, Pearl Jam played a portion of the Disney song "Let It Go" tagged onto the end of their own song "Daughter". At the Telenor Arena in Oslo, the band played the song "Strangest Tribe" live for the first time.

On October 1, 2014, Pearl Jam started the American Midwest leg in Cincinnati at the U.S. Bank Arena, playing for more than three hours. On October 5, the band made their first of two appearances at the Austin City Limits Music Festival. On October 9, what would have been John Lennon's 74th birthday, frontman Eddie Vedder covered "You've Got to Hide Your Love Away" and "Imagine" at the Pinnacle Bank Arena in Lincoln, Nebraska.

On October 17 at the iWireless Center in Moline, Illinois, Pearl Jam played the whole of their fourth album, "No Code", in order as part of their set. Three nights later at the BMO Harris Bradley Center in Milwaukee, the band played the whole of their fifth album "Yield". Bassist Jeff Ament would later admit that he was not a fan of playing full albums in order, but it created "a good tension".

At the Bridge School Benefit on October 25, Pearl Jam were joined onstage with Soundgarden frontman Chris Cornell and played the Temple of the Dog song "Hunger Strike".

Opening acts
Midlake opened in Dallas and Oklahoma City and Mudhoney opened for all the shows from Portland to Seattle. For the other North American shows, there was no support. On the European leg Black Rebel Motorcycle Club played the show at the Milton Keynes Bowl with American hardcore band Off! opening.

Tour dates

Festivals and other miscellaneous performances

Band members
Pearl Jam
Jeff Ament – bass guitar
Matt Cameron – drums
Stone Gossard – rhythm guitar, lead guitar
Mike McCready – lead guitar
Eddie Vedder – lead vocals, guitar

Additional musicians
Boom Gaspar – Hammond B3 and keyboards

References

2013 concert tours
2014 concert tours
Pearl Jam concert tours